The 2015 European Eventing Championship was held from September 10 to September 13, 2015 at Blair Castle, Scotland, UK.
The competition is also used as qualification to the 2016 Summer Olympics. Two teams were to qualify. Germany, Great Britain, Ireland and Netherlands were already qualified. The two best teams outside those - France and Sweden - qualified.

Results 
Final Individual Result

Team results 

Team Standings

EL = Eliminated
Rt = Retired
WD = Withdrew
DNQ = Did not qualify

European Eventing Championships
Eventing
European Eventing Championship
European Eventing Championship
International sports competitions hosted by Scotland
Equestrian sports competitions in the United Kingdom